Miriam Lahnstein (born 9 August 1974 in Düsseldorf, West Germany) is a German actress and psychologist.

Lahnstein portrayed villainess Tanja von Anstetten on the Das Erste soap opera Verbotene Liebe from 1995 until 1998, reprising the role briefly in 2001. She rejoined the show from April 2004 to March 2007, when she left the series because of her second pregnancy. She returned later in 2007 and remained on the series until its cancellation in 2015.

From 2003 to 2004, Lahnstein played Sabine Huber in the soap opera Marienhof. She has also made guest appearances in several popular German television series.

Filmography 
Verbotene Liebe (Forbidden love) (soap opera, 1995–1998, 2001, 2004–2007, 2007-2010, 2010-2016), as Tanja von Anstetten
Marienhof (soap opera, 2004), as Sabine Huber
Die Pfefferkörner (teen-crime TV series, 2001–2004), as Jacqueline
Alles Bob! (romantic comedy, 1999), as Claudia

External links 
 
 Miriam Lahnstein fanpage 
 Lahnstein agency profile, frank-oliver-schulz 

Living people
German television actresses
1974 births
Actors from Düsseldorf
German soap opera actresses